Mede is a comune (municipality) in the Province of Pavia in the Italian region Lombardy, located about 50 km southwest of Milan and about 35 km southwest of Pavia. As of 31 December 2004, it had a population of 6,993 and an area of 33.4 km2.

Mede borders the following municipalities: Frascarolo, Gambarana, Lomello, Pieve del Cairo, Sartirana Lomellina, Semiana, Torre Beretti e Castellaro, Villa Biscossi.

Demographic evolution

References

Cities and towns in Lombardy